Playground of the Damned is the fifteenth studio album by American heavy metal band Manilla Road. It was released on October 25, 2011 on Shadow Kingdom Records in CD format and on High Roller Records in LP format.

Track listing
 "Jackhammer" - 5:27
 "Into the Maelström" - 4:47
 "Playground of the Damned" - 4:27
 "Grindhouse" - 7:51
 "Abattoir de la Mort" - 7:15
 "Fire of Asshurbanipal" - 4:41
 "Brethren of the Hammer" - 5:03
 "Art of War" - 7:16

Credits
 Mark Shelton - Guitars (6 & 12 string), Vocals (lead & backing)
 Bryan Patrick - Vocals (lead & backing)
 Cory Christner - Drums
 Vince Golman - Bass

References

Manilla Road albums
2011 albums